Luis Felipe Madrigal Hernández (born 19 August 1948) is a Mexican politician affiliated with the Institutional Revolutionary Party. As of 2014 he served as Deputy of the LIX Legislature of the Mexican Congress representing Tabasco.

References

1948 births
Living people
Politicians from Tabasco
Institutional Revolutionary Party politicians
Universidad Juárez Autónoma de Tabasco alumni
Members of the Congress of Tabasco
20th-century Mexican politicians
21st-century Mexican politicians
Deputies of the LIX Legislature of Mexico
Members of the Chamber of Deputies (Mexico) for Tabasco